Blackout is a 2008 psychological thriller film directed by Rigoberto Castañeda and starring Amber Tamblyn, Aidan Gillen, Armie Hammer, and Katie Stuart. It is based on the eponymous novel by Italian novelist Gianluca Morozzi, although the plot of the film deviates heavily from the source material. The plot is about three people, one of whom is a serial killer, who are trapped in an elevator after a power blackout.

Plot

Three strangers (two men and a woman) are riding in an elevator when a power outage leaves them stranded. It is slowly revealed that one of the men is suffering from losing his wife. The other man had just experienced a domestic disturbance with his girlfriend's father. The woman, covered in blood, just left the hospital after visiting her grandmother.

The movie opens with Karl visiting his wife's grave. His young daughter shows up with Karl's sister-in-law and they play Marco Polo for a while. He asks his sister-in-law to care for his daughter so he can take care of something. He drives home where the blackout traps him. During flashbacks we see him taking photos of a woman whom he later buys a drink and takes to his car.

Claudia is a student who lives with her grandmother. Her grandmother advises to relax and enjoy life. The story opens with Claudia covered in blood, leaving a hospital for home. She enters the elevator, which she notices is making weird noises.

Tommy at first appears tough. He is first shown leaving his girlfriend's house on his motorcycle, then entering the elevator along with Karl and Claudia. When Karl takes Tommy's picture, claiming to have captured the perfect picture of angst, Tommy freaks out and demands he delete it. During a flashback we learn he is a former drug addict and fought with his girlfriend's alcoholic father. When he and Claudia start arguing, Karl urges them to remain calm. Tommy is then shown playing with a butterfly knife, which they subsequently use to keep the elevator's door open for ventilation. Tommy eventually climbs out the top of the elevator, looking for help.

As Tommy is climbing up the elevator shaft Claudia flashes back to earlier that day. As she and her grandmother are leaving the building, a homeless man asks her for money. Her grandmother keeps walking and off screen is hit by a car.

Karl begins to speak about his night before with a woman and that he needs to clean up the apartment before his daughter arrives. Tommy, meanwhile, struggles up the shaft but falls hard onto the elevator, breaking his leg and causing the elevator to fall several floors. Claudia begins to have a slight asthma attack, but is able to control it. Karl, a doctor, reluctantly helps tend to Tommy's broken leg. Claudia reveals that she has a bottle of water, causing Karl to accuse her of keeping secrets.

At 4:00 a.m. they all agree to yell for help. Tommy flashes back to his abused girlfriend whom Tommy urges to run away with him. They agree to leave that night. When Tommy doesn't show up, his girlfriend comes looking for him. She pushes the elevator button but nothing happens. She looks around and decides to use the stairs. Karl becomes more hostile and begins smoking despite Claudia's pleas. Meanwhile, Tommy's girlfriend bangs on his door, but he doesn't answer. She hears the group fighting but cannot determine where the sound is coming from. In the midst of their fight, the elevator slips further, closing the door and scaring them into remaining calm. Tommy's girlfriend begins calling for him but hears nothing and leaves.

Claudia then flashes back to her dying grandmother asking for a photo of her husband, explaining why she returned to the building. Karl flips out when Claudia reveals she has a candy bar. He steals her inhaler, demanding she exchange it for the candy. She complies, but he retains her inhaler and crushes Tommy's leg, claiming he is now the leader and is asserting his position.

Karl flashes back to the woman in his room. He tortures, rapes and kills her and returns to his building to clean up. Karl reveals to Tommy that he is a killer while Claudia is sleeping. Karl worries that his daughter will discover the girl's body in his apartment. Karl tells a semiconscious Tommy that he must get out soon or he will slit Tommy's throat and rape Claudia.

Claudia awakes to a smoking and urinating Karl and demands her inhaler back. Karl demands an almost breathless Claudia to get up to the elevator's top hatch and pull a fire alarm Karl had discovered while they were sleeping. He forces her to do so by throwing her inhaler on top of the elevator so she has to climb up to retrieve it. She climbs up and struggles to reach the alarm. As she reaches the alarm she drops her inhaler and it shatters. The ledge she is holding on to collapses and she falls into the elevator cage.

Karl has flipped out because he thinks his daughter knows his secret. Through flashbacks, it is revealed that his wife committed suicide. Claudia wants Tommy's knife to open the door, but Karl says it's no use, mocking her. He reveals to both that he is a killer. Karl flashes his camera, causing the other two to squint. Karl stabs Tommy, killing him.

Claudia pleads with Karl for mercy, which only maddens him. They fight, causing the elevator to slip closer to a floor. They continue to struggle with each other, but Claudia knocks him back. She opens the doors and starts to climb out, but Karl begins stabbing her legs. She kicks him and he falls back. She escapes as the elevator slips again, severing Karl's arm.

Claudia is too late to deliver the photo.

Cast
Amber Tamblyn as Claudia
Aidan Gillen as Karl
Armie Hammer as Tommy
Katie Stuart as Francesca
Emma Prescott as Nikki
Mark Boone Junior as Francesca's Father (uncredited)

Release
Blackout was released on DVD in the U.S. on January 13, 2009.

Box office
The film was released in Russia on May 29, 2008 and debuted at #7, averaging $2,118 on 68 screens, for a gross of $144,015. The film finished with a gross of $296,411 in Russia.

Reception
Michael Bonedigger of HorrorNews.net called it "A smart, gripping and intelligent suspense ride".  Annie Riordan of Brutal as Hell rated the film 3/5 stars and stated that the plot requires much suspension of disbelief, but it's worth watching.

References

External links
 
 
 

2008 films
2000s thriller films
American horror thriller films
Films shot in Spain
Films shot in Los Angeles
Films based on Italian novels
2008 horror films
Films set in elevators
Films scored by Reinhold Heil
Films scored by Johnny Klimek
2000s English-language films
2000s American films